The following is a list of Thelymitra species accepted by the Index Kewensis at May 2018.

 Thelymitra abrupta R.J.Bates 2016 (S.A.)
 Thelymitra adorata Jeanes 2011 – praying sun orchid (N.S.W.)
 Thelymitra aemula Cheeseman 1919 – gumland sun orchid (N.Z.)
 Thelymitra aggericola D.L.Jones 1999 – bleak sun orchid (Tas.)
 Thelymitra albiflora Jeanes 2004 – white sun orchid (S.A.)
 Thelymitra alcockiae Jeanes 2013 – Kath's sun orchid (Vic., S.A.)
 Thelymitra alpicola Jeanes 2012 – alpine striped sun orchid (N.S.W., Vic.)
 Thelymitra alpina Jeanes 2013 – mountain sun orchid (A.C.T., N.S.W., Vic.)
 Thelymitra angustifolia R.Br. 1810 – long-leaved sun orchid (N.S.W., Qld.)
 Thelymitra antennifera (Lindl.) Hook.f. 1858 – rabbit-eared sun orchid, lemon-scented orchid, vanilla orchid (W.A., S.A., Vic.)
 Thelymitra apiculata (A.S.George) M.A.Clem. & D.L.Jones 1989 – Cleopatra's needles (W.A.)
 Thelymitra arenaria Lindl. 1840 – forest sun orchid (N.S.W., A.C.T., Vic., Tas., S.A.)
 Thelymitra aristata Lindl. 1840 – great sun orchid (N.S.W., Vic., Tas., S.A.)
 Thelymitra atronitida Jeanes – black-hooded sun orchid 2000 (N.S.W., Vic., Tas.)
 Thelymitra azurea R.S.Rogers 1917 – azure sun orchid (Vic.)
 Thelymitra basaltica Jeanes – grasslands sun orchid 2004 (Vic.)
 Thelymitra batesii Jeanes 2004 – plump sun orchid (S.A.)
 Thelymitra benthamiana Rchb.f. 1871 – blotched sun orchid, leopard sun orchid (W.A., S.A., Vic., Tas.)
 Thelymitra bracteata J.Z.Weber ex Jeanes 2004 – leafy sun orchid, large-bracted sun orchid (S.A., Tas., Vic.)
 Thelymitra brevifolia Jeanes 2004 – peppertop sun orchid, short-leaf sun orchid (N.S.W., A.C.T., Vic. Tas., S.A.)
 Thelymitra campanulata Lindl. 1840 – bell-shaped thelymitra, shirt orchid (W.A.)
 Thelymitra canaliculata R.Br. 1810 – flushed sun orchid, blue sun orchid (W.A.)
 Thelymitra carnea R.Br. 1810 – tiny sun orchid (Qld., N.S.W., Vic., Tas., N.Z.)
 Thelymitra × chasmogama R.S.Rogers 2011 – globe-hood sun orchid (S.A., Vic.)
 Thelymitra circumsepta Fitzg. 1878 – naked sun orchid (N.S.W., Vic., S.A., Tas.)
 Thelymitra colensoi Hook.f. 1864 – Colenso's sun orchid (N.Z.)
 Thelymitra cornicina Rchb.f. 1871 – lilac sun orchid (W.A.)
 Thelymitra corrugata R.J.Bates 2013 (S.A.)
 Thelymitra crenulata R.J.Bates 2010 (S.A.)
 Thelymitra crinita Lindl. 1840 – long-haired thelymitra, blue lady orchid (W.A.)
 Thelymitra cucullata Rupp 1946 – swamp sun orchid (W.A.)
 Thelymitra cyanapicata Jeanes 2004 – dark-tipped sun orchid (Vic.)
 Thelymitra cyanea (Lindl.) Benth. 1873 – veined sun orchid (N.S.W., Vic., Tas., S.A., N.Z.)
 Thelymitra dedmaniarum R.S.Rogers 1938 – cinnamon sun orchid (W.A.)
 Thelymitra × dentata L.B.Moore 1968 (N.Z.)
 Thelymitra epipactoides F.Muell. 1866 – metallic sun orchid (Vic., S.A.)
 Thelymitra erosa D.L.Jones & M.A.Clem. 1998 – striped sun orchid (Tas.)
 Thelymitra exigua Jeanes 2004 – short sun orchid (S.A.)
 Thelymitra flexuosa Endl. 1839 – twisted sun orchid (W.A., S.A., Vic., Tas.)
 Thelymitra forbesii Ridl. in H.O.Forbes 1885 (East Timor)
 Thelymitra formosa Colenso 1884 (N.Z.)
 Thelymitra fragrans D.L.Jones & M.A.Clem. 1988 – fragrant sun orchid (Qld., N.S.W.)
 Thelymitra frenchii Jeanes 2004 – scarp sun orchid, Jarrahdale sun orchid (W.A.)
 Thelymitra fuscolutea R.Br. 1810 – chestnut sun orchid (W.A.)
 Thelymitra glaucophylla R.J.Bates ex Jeanes  2013 (S.A.)
 Thelymitra graminea Lindl. 1840 – shy sun orchid (W.A.)
 Thelymitra grandiflora Fitz. 1882 – giant sun orchid (S.A.)
 Thelymitra grandiflora subsp. exposa R.J.Bates 2014 (S.A.)
 Thelymitra grandiflora  Fitz. subsp. grandiflora 1882 (S.A.)
 Thelymitra granitora D.L.Jones & M.A.Clem. 1998 – coastal granite sun orchid, coastal sun orchid (W.A.)
 Thelymitra gregaria D.L.Jones & M.A.Clem. 1998 – clumping sun orchid (Vic.)
 Thelymitra hatchii L.B.Moore 1968 (N.Z.)
 Thelymitra hiemalis D.L.Jones & M.A.Clem. 1998 – winter sun orchid (Vic.)
 Thelymitra holmesii Nicholls 1932 – plain sun orchid (W.A., S.A., Vic., Tas.)
 Thelymitra hygrophila R.J.Bates 2010 – blue star sun orchid (S.A.)
 Thelymitra imbricata D.L.Jones & M.A.Clem. 1998 – broad sun orchid (Tas.)
 Thelymitra improcera D.L.Jones & M.A.Clem. – coastal sun orchid 1998 (Vic., Tas.)
 Thelymitra incurva Jeanes 2012 – coastal striped sun orchid (Vic., N.S.W.)
 Thelymitra inflata Jeanes 2004 inflated sun orchid (Vic., S.A., Tas.)
 Thelymitra irregularis Nicholls 1946 – crested sun orchid (Vic., N.S.W., Tas.)
 Thelymitra ixioides Sw., 1800 – spotted sun orchid (Qld., N.S.W., Vic., Tas., S.A., N.Z.)
 Thelymitra jacksonii Hopper & A.P.Br. ex jeanes 2006 (W.A.)
 Thelymitra javanica Blume 1825 (Indonesia and the Philippines)
 Thelymitra jonesii Jeanes 2001 – skyblue sun orchid (Tas.)
 Thelymitra juncifolia Lindl. 1840 – large-spotted sun orchid (N.S.W., A.C.T., Vic., Tas., S.A.)
 Thelymitra kangaloonica Jeanes 2011 – Kangaloon sun orchid (N.S.W.)
 Thelymitra latifolia R.J.Bates 2001 (S.A.)
 Thelymitra latiloba Jeanes 2001 – wandoo sun orchid, wandoo shirt orchid (W.A.)
 Thelymitra longifolia J.R.Forst. & G.Forst. 1775 – white sun orchid, maikuku (N.Z.)
 Thelymitra longiloba D.L.Jones & M.A.Clem. 1998 – lobed sun orchid (N.S.W., Vic., Tas.)
 Thelymitra lucida Jeanes 2004 – glistening sun orchid (Vic., Tas.)
 Thelymitra luteocilium Fitzg. 1882 – fringed sun orchid (S.A., Vic.)
 Thelymitra × mackibbinii (= Thelymitra mackibbinii) F.Muell. 1881 – brilliant sun orchid (S.A., Vic.)
 Thelymitra × macmillanii F.Muell. 1865 – red sun orchid, crimson sun orchid (S.A., Vic.)
 Thelymitra macrophylla Lindl. 1840 – large-leafed thelymitra (W.A.)
 Thelymitra maculata Jeanes 2009 – spotted curly locks, eastern curly locks (W.A.)
 Thelymitra magnifica Jeanes 2006 (W.A.) – Crystal Brook sun orchid
 Thelymitra malvina M.A.Clem., D.L.Jones & Molloy 1989 – mauve-tufted sun orchid (Qld., N.S.W., Vic., Tas., S.A., N.Z.)
 Thelymitra matthewsii Cheeseman 1910 (publ. 1911) – spiral sun orchid (Vic., S.A., N.Z.)
 Thelymitra media R.Br. 1810 – tall sun orchid (N.S.W., Vic., Tas.)
 Thelymitra media  R.Br.var. media (N.S.W., Vic.)
 Thelymitra media var. carneolutea Nicholls  1943 (Vic.)
 Thelymitra megacalyptra Fitzg. 1879 – plains sun orchid (N.S.W., Vic., A.C.T., S.A.)
 Thelymitra merraniae Nicholls 1929 – Merran's sun orchid (N.S.W., S.A., Vic., Tas.)
 Thelymitra mucida Fitzg. 1882 – plum sun orchid (W.A., S.A., Vic., Tas.)
 Thelymitra nervosa Colenso 1887 (publ. 1888) (N.Z.)
 Thelymitra nuda R.Br. 1810 – plain thelymitra (N.S.W., A.C.T., Vic. Tas., S.A.)
 Thelymitra occidentalis Jeanes 2001 – western azure sun orchid, rimmed sun orchid (W.A., S.A.)
 Thelymitra odora R.J.Bates 2010 (S.A.)
 Thelymitra orientalis R.J.Bates 2010 (Vic.)
 Thelymitra pallidiflora Jeanes 2004 –pale sun orchid (Vic.)
 Thelymitra pallidifructus R.J.Bates 2010 (S.A.)
 Thelymitra paludosa Jeanes 2013 (W.A.)
 Thelymitra papuana J.J.Sm. 1934 – Papua thelymitra (New Guinea)
 Thelymitra pauciflora R.Br. 1810 – slender sun orchid (Qld., N.S.W., A.C.T., Vic., Tas., S.A., N.Z.)
 Thelymitra peniculata Jeanes 2004 – trim sun orchid (N.S.W., Vic., S.A., A.C.T., Tas.)
 Thelymitra petrophila Jeanes 2013 (W.A.)
 Thelymitra planicola Jeanes 2000 – glaucous sun orchid (Vic., N.S.W.)
 Thelymitra polychroma D.L.Jones & M.A.Clem. 1998 – rainbow sun orchid (Tas.)
 Thelymitra psammophila C.R.P.Andrews 1905 – sandplain sun orchid (W.A.)
 Thelymitra pulchella Hook.f. 1853 (N.Z.)
 Thelymitra pulcherrima Jeanes 2009 – northern Queen of Sheba (W.A.)
 Thelymitra purpurata Rupp 1946 – wallum sun orchid (Qld., N.S.W.)
 Thelymitra purpureofusca Colenso 1880 (N.Z.)
 Thelymitra queenslandica Jeanes – northern sun orchid 2013 (Qld.)
 Thelymitra reflexa Jeanes 2005 – reflexed sun orchid (Vic.)
 Thelymitra rubra Fitzg. 1882 – salmon sun orchid (N.S.W., Vic., Tas., S.A.)
 Thelymitra rubricaulis R.J.Bates 2010 (S.A.)
 Thelymitra sanscilia H.S.Irwin ex Hatch 1952 (N.Z.)
 Thelymitra sarasiniana Kraenzl. in F.Sarasin & J.Roux 1914 (New Caledonia)
 Thelymitra sargentii R.S.Rogers 1930 – freckled sun orchid (W.A.)
 Thelymitra silena D.L.Jones 1999 – madonna sun orchid (Tas.)
 Thelymitra simulata D.L.Jones & M.A.Clem. 1998 – collared sun orchid (N.S.W., A.C.T., Vic., Tas.)
 Thelymitra spadicea D.L.Jones & M.A.Clem. 1998 – browntop sun orchid (Tas.)
 Thelymitra sparsa D.L.Jones & M.A.Clem. 1998 – wispy sun orchid (Tas.)
 Thelymitra speciosa Jeanes 2009 – eastern Queen of Sheba (W.A.)
 Thelymitra spiralis (Lindl.) F.Muell. 1865 – curly locks (W.A.)
 Thelymitra stellata Lindl. 1840 – starry sun orchid, star orchid (W.A.)
 Thelymitra tholiformis Molloy & Hatch 1990 (N.Z.)
 Thelymitra tigrina R.Br. 1810 – tiger orchid, tiger sun orchid (W.A.)
 Thelymitra × truncata R.S.Rogers 1917 – truncate sun orchid (Vic., S.A., Tas.)
 Thelymitra uliginosa Jeanes 2009 – southern curly locks, swamp curly locks (W.A.)
 Thelymitra variegata (Lindl.) F.Muell. 1865 – Queen of Sheba (W.A.)
 Thelymitra venosa R.Br. 1810 – large veined sun orchid (N.S.W.)
 Thelymitra villosa Lindl. 1840 – custard orchid (W.A.)
 Thelymitra viridis Jeanes 2004 – green sun orchid (Tas.)
 Thelymitra vulgaris Jeanes 2004 – slender sun orchid, common sun orchid (W.A.)
 Thelymitra xanthotricha Jeanes 2004 – yellow tufted sun orchid (W.A.)
 Thelymitra yorkensis Jeanes 2006 – York sun orchid, bronze sun orchid (W.A.)

Natural hybrids
 Thelymitra × chasmogama R.S.Rogers  1927 (T. luteocilium × T. nuda)
 Thelymitra × dentata L.B.Moore 1968 (T. longifolia × T. pulchella)
 Thelymitra × mackibbinii F.Muell. 1881 (T. × macmillanii × T. nuda)
 Thelymitra × macmillanii F.Muell. 1865 (T. antennifera × T. luteocilium)
 Thelymitra × truncata R.S.Rogers 1917

Intergeneric hybrid
 xCalomitra (Calochilus x Thelymitra) (unplaced name)

References

Thelymitra